The Muppets: A Celebration of 30 Years is a one-hour special starring Jim Henson's Muppets. It was shot in Toronto, Ontario in 1985 and aired January 21, 1986 on CBS.

Plot

Muppets from The Muppet Show, Sesame Street, Sam and Friends, Uncle Traveling Matt and Sprocket from Fraggle Rock, and other Muppet-related characters host a banquet to celebrate their thirtieth anniversary by presenting a retrospective of their film and television appearances.

After a montage of Muppet clips from 1955 to 1984, and overlaid with Ethel Merman singing "There's No Business Like Show Business", an elegant ballroom is revealed jam-packed with (as the announcer, an uncredited John Harlan, states) "all of Jim Henson's Muppets-except for those who couldn't make it".

Hosted by Fozzie Bear and featuring guest of honor Kermit the Frog, the program provides an overview of the Muppets' history and musical highlights. Kermit does not feel he deserves the cheesy words Fozzie uses to describe, but Fozzie insists, reminding Kermit that he was the one who began the Muppets' careers. A clip from The Muppet Movie is shown, with Kermit getting the Muppets their big break in Hollywood. A montage of early appearances in the 1950s and early 1960s is then shown. These include clips from Sam and Friends, The Ed Sullivan Show, and commercials for Wilkins Coffee and La Choy. Kermit then mentions that Rowlf the Dog was "the first Muppet to have a regular spot on network television". A clip featuring Rowlf on The Jimmy Dean Show is shown. This is followed by a clip from The Ed Sullivan Show (with a clip from The Muppet Show replacing the actual sketch that Sullivan introduces), Kermit's 1975 appearance on Cher, and a clip of Kermit's 1979 guest host appearance on The Tonight Show. Fozzie then introduces some of Kermit's old friends from Sam and Friends where Sam and Harry the Hipster are shown as Harry comments that Kermit is different from the last time he has seen him. When Kermit asks where Yorick is, Yorick appears next to him as he attempts to eat Kermit's arm.

Then, Fozzie introduces a selection of clips from The Muppet Show (Fozzie and Rowlf singing "I Got Rhythm", Gonzo the Great's motorcycle stunt, the Swedish Chef's encounter with a group of Mexican lobsters, and Rita Moreno's performance of "Fever" with Animal), before Rowlf the Dog introduces a montage of clips to honor Miss Piggy. After accidentally falling down a flight of stairs, Miss Piggy arrives alongside Kermit to wish him a happy 
30th birthday. Kermit tries to convince Piggy that it's not just his birthday, but "ours", too. Miss Piggy convinces Kermit otherwise. The two then introduce a montage of clips from The Muppet Movie, The Great Muppet Caper, and The Muppets Take Manhattan, all overlaid by "Hey, a Movie!" from The Great Muppet Caper. After the montage, Lew Zealand pops up between Kermit and Piggy to bring up "the bicycle scene" from The Great Muppet Caper. A clip is shown.

Dr. Teeth introduces a sequence featuring still images of various Muppet book covers, record covers, and magazine covers featuring appearances by the Muppets. Fozzie mentions that the Muppets are seen on television in 150 countries. Before Fozzie can continue, Sweetums and other Muppet monsters interrupt, complaining that their favorite clips were never shown. A montage featuring Muppet monsters, monsters eating other Muppets, and explosions is shown, with "Millions of Us Who are Ugly" and the 1812 Overture playing over the clips. After the montage, Crazy Harry pops up for one more explosion. Count von Count then introduce Bert and Ernie. Bert tries to give a speech, but is interrupted by Ernie pulling "the old nose joke" on him. A montage of clips from Sesame Street is shown. After a collection of scenes overlaid by the Sesame Street theme song, more clips are shown (Kermit singing the alphabet with a little girl, Bert playing checkers with Bernice the pigeon, Cookie Monster singing his trademark song "'C' is for Cookie", and Big Bird parodying American Express ads). Oscar the Grouch then grumpily introduces Big Bird, who introduces clips from other children's shows from the Muppets. Clips featuring live action baby versions of the Muppets in The Muppets Take Manhattan is shown followed by clips from the animated Saturday Morning cartoon Muppet Babies. Then, clips from the short-lived Saturday Morning cartoon Little Muppet Monsters is shown, and is followed by a montage of clips from Fraggle Rock.

The Swedish Chef then introduces the Singing Food, who introduce a clip of the Galley-oh-hoop-hoop. Uncle Traveling Matt introduces twenty-one clips involving imagination, overlaid by Ben Vereen singing "Pure Imagination". Floyd Pepper and Janice then introduce Muppet music clips (Ernie singing "Rubber Duckie", Mahna Mahna and the Snowths singing "Mahna Mahna", the Muppet chickens playing the piano, Bobby Benson and his Baby Band performing, various Alaska Muppets singing "Lullaby of Broadway", and Dr. Teeth and The Electric Mayhem performing "Rockin' Robin"). Afterwards, Scooter introduces clips with guest stars (Steve Martin, Ethel Merman, Zero Mostel, Diana Ross, Lily Tomlin, Elton John, and George Burns). When Robin asks Kermit what his favorite thing about the Muppets are, Kermit says that his favorite scenes are the times when the Muppets don't try to be funny, leading to a montage of some of the Muppets more serious moments (Harry Belafonte's "Turn the World Around", various Muppet animals singing "For What It's Worth", Kermit singing "It's Not Easy Bein' Green" - first alone, and then with Ray Charles). Gonzo then introduces some of the Muppets' more cultural moments (five clips from The Muppets Go to the Movies, two Muppet News Flashes, and a "Pigs in Space" skit).

Afterwards, Fozzie and the other Muppets decide to pay tribute to Kermit, showing a clip of Linda Ronstadt singing "When I Grow Too Old to Dream", reedited to feature a number of (7) clips with Kermit, which is so emotional for the Muppets, it causes all of them (except Kermit) to start crying. At the conclusion, a clip from the finale of The Muppet Movie is shown with the Muppets singing "The Rainbow Connection". After the clip, the entire cast reprises the song.

Jim Henson appears briefly at the conclusion of the program being given a bill for his food by Grover.

In the closing, Kermit says, "Thanks, everybody. It's been a great birthday party. Our next 30 years start tomorrow, so there will be a rehearsal at 9 AM sharp."

"Happy Feet" plays during the end credits (sequence with multiple Kermit images cut).

Notes
 Later syndicated alongside The Muppet Show.
 The Muppets: A Celebration of 30 Years makes reference to the short-lived Saturday Morning series Little Muppet Monsters, which was still in production during the taping of this special. However, the series was cancelled by the time the special aired.

Cast
 Jim Henson - Himself

Muppet performers
 Jim Henson - Kermit the Frog, Rowlf the Dog, Ernie, Dr. Teeth, The Swedish Chef, Waldorf, Link Hogthrob, Sam, Harry the Hipster, and Yorick 
 Frank Oz - Miss Piggy, Fozzie Bear, Animal, Sam Eagle, Bert, Grover, and Cookie Monster
 Jerry Nelson - Floyd Pepper, Count von Count, Crazy Harry, Lew Zealand, Two-Headed Monster (Left Head), Robin the Frog, and Camilla the Chicken
 Richard Hunt - Scooter, Janice, Statler, Sweetums, and Two-Headed Monster (Right Head)
 Dave Goelz - Gonzo the Great, Zoot, Uncle Traveling Matt, and Beauregard
 Steve Whitmire - Sprocket the Dog and Rizzo the Rat
 Caroll Spinney - Big Bird and Oscar the Grouch
 Sally Kellerman - Miss Finch

Additional Muppets performed by Terry Angus, Kevin Clash, Camille Bonora, David Rudman, Michael Earl, Jonathan Paine, and Fred Stinson

Appearing in archive footage
 Julie Andrews
 Harry Belafonte
 Carol Burnett
 George Burns
 Ray Charles
 Cher
 James Coburn
 Jimmy Dean
 John Denver
 Elton John
 Gene Kelly
 Steve Martin
 Ed McMahon
 Ethel Merman
 Rita Moreno
 Zero Mostel
 Linda Ronstadt
 Diana Ross
 Brooke Shields
 Sylvester Stallone
 Ed Sullivan
 Lily Tomlin
 Ben Vereen
 Orson Welles

External links
 The Muppets: A Celebration of 30 Years at Henson.com
 The Muppets: A Celebration of 30 Years at Internet Movie Database

Crossover fiction
The Muppets television specials
1986 television specials
Television shows written by Jerry Juhl